Crude can refer to:

 Crude oil or simply crude, the unprocessed form of petroleum
 Crude (2007 film), an Australian documentary about the geology and economics of crude oil
 Crude (2009 film), an American documentary about oil companies and lawsuits in Ecuador
 Crude (album), by Bongshang, 1993
 Crude (comic), a comic book series by Steve Orlando and Garry Brown
 Oklahoma Crude, a former National Indoor Football League team